Fire engine red is an informal name for an intense, bright red commonly used on emergency vehicles in many countries on fire service vehicles. There is no unique shade, although different fire services may have a required specification. The color has long been used, although not by all fire vehicles.

Background

Traditional fire departments in large U.S. central cities and major metropolitan areas use this color on fire engines, but many suburbs and smaller cities use the color lime or bright yellow for their fire engines because of its greater visibility at night. In the U.K. the fire service added the more visible Battenburg markings in fire-engine red and retro-reflective yellow, often on a predominantly red vehicle.

Initial research into fire appliance visibility was conducted by the Lanchester College of Technology and the Fire Brigade in Coventry, in the UK in c. 1965. It concluded that under the range of artificial street lighting in common use at the time, yellow better retained its conspicuity than red. Yellow was also more conspicuous in general road conditions in the daytime and during inclement weather. Research conducted by Stephen Solomon, a New York optometrist, promoted the use of "lime yellow" in the United States from the mid-1970s. Solomon conducted studies of the rate of vehicle accidents involving fire apparatus, concluding that the more conspicuously colored fire apparatus suffered a lower accident rate than the less conspicuous red used by the same fire department.

Further research supporting the use of yellow for all emergency vehicles was published in 1978 in Australia.

Gallery

See also 
 Green Goddess
 International orange
 List of colors
 Safety orange
 School bus yellow

References

External links

Firefighting equipment
Shades of red